Hull Royal Infirmary is a tertiary teaching hospital and is one of the two main hospitals for Kingston upon Hull (the other being Castle Hill Hospital in nearby Cottingham). It is situated on Anlaby Road, just outside the city centre, and is run by Hull University Teaching Hospitals NHS Trust.

History

The infirmary was first established in temporary premises in George Street in 1782 before permanent premises could be completed and opened in Prospect Street in 1784. John Alderson, a physician at the infirmary, founded the "Sculcoates Refuge for the Insane" in 1814. After the Duke and Duchess of Edinburgh laid the foundation stone for a new building in 1884, it was renamed Hull Royal Infirmary.

After the old buildings in Prospect Street became dilapidated in the 1950s, the infirmary moved to new premises in Anlaby Road, which were designed by architects Yorke Rosenberg Mardall and for which the foundation stone was laid by Enoch Powell on 25 September 1963. The construction was undertaken by Trollope & Colls and the new facilities were opened by the Queen in June 1967. The new hospital incorporated a distinctive 13-storey tower designed to accommodate the majority of the medical facilities.

The hospital's Accident and Emergency Department had a £7 million refurbishment, intended to improve the range the services being offered, in October 2011. Work began to install a new 24-bed prefabricated ward on top of a 4-storey building to the rear of the main tower block in November 2014.

In 2021, the trust announced further expansion plans including the construction of a new three-storey front entrance at the main hospital tower block, a new £6 million Allam Diabetes Centre on Anlaby Road, and a new £8 million intensive care unit.

Facilities
The hospital has a dedicated Centre for Magnetic Resonance Investigations on site which houses two MRI scanners. It also houses the dedicated Hull Royal Eye Hospital which provides tertiary level sub-speciality ophthalmic care.

See also
 List of hospitals in England

References

Buildings and structures completed in 1782
Hospital buildings completed in 1884
Hospital buildings completed in 1967
Hospitals in Kingston upon Hull
1782 establishments in England